John Le Hunte (1658–1697) was an Anglican priest.

Le Hunte was born in County Tipperary and educated at Trinity College, Dublin. 
 He was Chancellor of Cashel Cathedral and Archdeacon of Emly from 1682 until his death.

References

Archdeacons of Emly
Alumni of Trinity College Dublin
17th-century Irish Anglican priests
1658 births
1697 deaths
People from County Tipperary